Mir Faiz Muhammad Khan Talpur (4 January 1913 - 1954), was 7th ruler of Sohrabani Talpur dynasty of Khairpur State from 1935 until 1947.

Biography 
He was born on 4 January 1913 to Mir Ali Nawaz Khan Talpur. He was educated at Mayo College in Ajmer. He succeeded to the Gaddi on the death of his father on 25 December 1935 and was crowned at Faiz Mahal in Khairpur. He married Dulhan Pasha Begum, daughter of Nawab Moin-ud-Daula at Hyderabad in 1932. He was deposed by the British on 19 July 1947, due to being mentally unfit and was succeeded by his only son, Mir George Ali Murad Khan. He died in 1954.

References 

Talpur dynasty

1913 births
1954 deaths